James Welsh (May 11, 1846 - December 17, 1916) was an Irish born soldier who fought in the American Civil War and received the Medal of Honor. The medal was awarded on 3 June 1905 for actions as a private in the 4th Rhode Island Infantry at the battle of Battle of the Crater, Petersburg, Virginia on 30 July 1864. He was born in Ireland and died in the former county of Elizabeth City, Virginia. He is buried in St. Paul Cemetery, Blackstone, Massachusetts.

Medal of Honor Citation 
For extraordinary heroism on 30 July 1864, in action at Petersburg, Virginia. Private Welsh bore off the regimental colors after the color sergeant had been wounded and the color corporal bearing the colors killed thereby saving the colors from capture.

References 

1846 births
1916 deaths
American Civil War recipients of the Medal of Honor
Irish-born Medal of Honor recipients